Karthik Raj is an Indian actor who works in Tamil film and television industry.

Career
Karthik started his acting career with the TV show,  Kana Kaanum Kaalangal Kalooriyin Kadhai (2011-2012), where he essayed the role of Karthikeyan.    Kana Kaanum Kaalangal Kalooriyin Kadhai was followed by Ram Vinayak’s  Office. He participated in  Jodi Number One  Season 7 with Nancy Jennifer. 
He also rendered his voice as a narrator in a short film "Yaanum Neeyum" starring Vetri, his co-actor in K5.

He has acted as a lead actor in the movies  465  and  Naalu Peruku Nalladhun Edhuvum Thappilla. The films, however, failed in the box office and his performance received mixed reviews. 

In 2017, Karthik essayed the role of Adithyaa in the Tamil daily soap  Sembaruthi  alongside newcomer Shabana Shajahan. The serial made Karthik a household name. In December 2020, however, Karthik Raj was replaced due to unforeseen reasons as quoted in the channel's official statement.

In 2020 Karthik starred in Mugilan  alongside Ramya Pandian. The crime thriller miniseries released on ZEE5 streaming platform on October 30, 2020 to mixed reviews.

Filmography

Film

Television

Awards
Karthik won the Favourite Actor Award and Favourite Onscreen Pair for Sembaruthi in the Zee Tamil Kudumbam Viruthugal program for three consecutive years (2018,2019,2020).

References

Living people
Tamil male television actors
Television personalities from Tamil Nadu
Male actors from Tamil Nadu
Male actors in Tamil cinema
21st-century Tamil male actors
Tamil Reality dancing competition contestants
1988 births